Nenad Mirosavljević (born 4 September 1977) is a Serbian former footballer who played as a striker.

During his 20-year-long career, Mirosavljević scored over 100 goals in the national championship of Serbia (including its predecessors) with five clubs, most notably Smederevo (formerly Sartid). He also played abroad for two Spanish and two Cypriot clubs, performing with APOEL in the UEFA Champions League.

Club career

Early years
Mirosavljević made his senior debut with Proleter Zrenjanin during the 1996–97 campaign, on the same team with future national team players Vladimir Ivić and Zvonimir Vukić. He scored five goals in 19 league appearances during his first season, as the team secured a spot in the 1997 UEFA Intertoto Cup. During his time at the club, Mirosavljević amassed a total of 102 league appearances and scored 27 goals.

Sartid Smederevo
In September 2000, Mirosavljević was snapped by Sartid Smederevo, making 25 league appearances and scoring 15 goals in his first season at the club. He tallied the same amount of league goals in the 2001–02 season, helping the team finish third in the national championship. In September 2002, in the UEFA Cup first round, Mirosavljević scored the opener against Ipswich Town in the first leg, a 1–1 draw at Portman Road. However, they were eliminated after a 1–0 loss at home. Mirosavljević also helped the club win the Serbia and Montenegro Cup in 2003. He remained at Smederevo during the 2004 UEFA Intertoto Cup, scoring seven goals in four matches, before moving abroad for the first time. In his four-year stint with the Oklopnici, Mirosavljević made a total of 118 league appearances and scored 59 goals.

Cádiz
In August 2004, Mirosavljević was transferred to Spanish club Cádiz. He spent two seasons at Cádiz, making 37 league appearances and scoring eight goals for the club. In his second season, while the club played in the top flight, Mirosavljević scored a goal against Barcelona in his team's 3–1 loss.

Partizan
On 1 August 2006, it was announced that Mirosavljević signed with Partizan on a three-year contract. He was given the number 30 shirt, making his debut for the club in a 2–0 home league win over Banat Zrenjanin on 19 August 2006. Mirosavljević scored his first goal for Partizan in the UEFA Cup group stage against Livorno on 2 November 2006, the game ended 1–1. He netted his first league goal for the club in a 2–1 away win over Banat Zrenjanin on 18 November 2006.

In January 2007, Mirosavljević secured a loan switch to Spanish club Vecindario. He made his debut for Vecindario against his former club Cádiz on 28 January 2007. Until the end of the 2006–07 season, Mirosavljević made 19 league appearances and scored three goals for Vecindario, as the club failed to avoid relegation.

Return to Smederevo
Subsequently, Mirosavljević had an unassuming brief spell at his former club Smederevo, scoring four goals in 12 league appearances. He also scored once in a 3–0 Serbian Cup victory over Novi Pazar on 26 September 2007.

APOEL
On 2 January 2008, Mirosavljević moved to Cyprus and signed an 18-month contract with APOEL. He made his competitive debut for the club on 12 January 2008 in a league fixture against APOP Kinyras. His first two goals for APOEL came on 30 January 2008 in a cup match against Aris Limassol. In December 2008, Mirosavljević extended his contract until the end of the 2010–11 season.

With his three goals, Mirosavljević helped APOEL qualify for the 2009–10 UEFA Champions League. He played five matches during the group stage and scored two goals. On 25 November 2009, Mirosavljević netted the opening goal in a 1–1 home draw versus Atlético Madrid. Two weeks later, on 8 December 2009, Mirosavljević came off the bench and scored a late equalizer as APOEL draw 2–2 with Chelsea at Stamford Bridge.

In March 2010, Mirosavljević suffered a ruptured Achilles tendon, causing him to miss the remainder of the 2009–10 season. After several months of recovering, Mirosavljević returned to the field in November 2010, making 10 appearances until the end of the 2010–11 season, without scoring a goal. In May 2011, Mirosavljević left APOEL after three and a half years, when the club announced that it would not renew the contract with the player. In an interview in 2012, Mirosavljević said that his time at APOEL was the heyday of his career.

Later years
In July 2011, after his contract with APOEL expired, Mirosavljević agreed to a one-year deal with fellow Cypriot First Division club Olympiakos Nicosia. He played his farewell match for Olympiakos on 28 January 2012, thus leaving Cyprus after four years to return to Serbia.

On 1 February 2012, Mirosavljević signed an 18-month contract with Napredak Kruševac and was immediately named as team captain. He scored a goal from the penalty spot on his debut for the club in a 3–0 home victory over Radnički Sombor. In the 2012–13 season, Mirosavljević led the club to promotion to the top flight of Serbian football.

During the 2014 winter transfer window, Mirosavljević moved to Čukarički, making 12 league appearances and scoring five goals until the end of the 2013–14 season. He also helped his club win its first major trophy by taking the 2014–15 Serbian Cup. After the end of the 2015–16 season, Mirosavljević retired from playing professional football.

International career
Mirosavljević played for the national B team of FR Yugoslavia in a friendly match against the Czech Republic national under-21 team in September 2002.

Post-playing career
Immediately upon hanging up his boots, Mirosavljević was named as vice-president of Čukarički. He also served as caretaker manager of their first team twice, in September 2016 and May 2018.

Career statistics

Honours
Sartid Smederevo
 Serbia and Montenegro Cup: 2002–03
Cádiz
 Segunda División: 2004–05
APOEL
 Cypriot First Division: 2008–09, 2010–11
 Cypriot Cup: 2007–08
 Cypriot Super Cup: 2008, 2009
Napredak Kruševac
 Serbian First League: 2012–13
Čukarički
 Serbian Cup: 2014–15

References

External links
 
 
 
 

APOEL FC players
Association football forwards
Cádiz CF players
Cypriot First Division players
Expatriate footballers in Cyprus
Expatriate footballers in Spain
FK Čukarički managers
FK Čukarički players
FK Napredak Kruševac players
FK Partizan players
FK Proleter Zrenjanin players
FK Smederevo players
La Liga players
Olympiakos Nicosia players
People from Požega, Croatia
Segunda División players
Serbia and Montenegro footballers
Serbian expatriate footballers
Serbian expatriate sportspeople in Cyprus
Serbian expatriate sportspeople in Spain
Serbian football managers
Serbian footballers
Serbian SuperLiga managers
Serbian SuperLiga players
Serbs of Croatia
UD Vecindario players
1977 births
Living people